AECB may refer to:

 Association for Environment Conscious Building, UK
 Acute exacerbations of chronic bronchitis, a medical condition
 Atomic Energy Control Board, former name of the Canadian Nuclear Safety Commission